DNA (Last Live at CBGB's) is a live album by DNA, released in 1993 through Avant Records.

Track listing

Personnel 
DNA
Arto Lindsay – guitar, vocals
Ikue Mori – drums
Tim Wright – bass guitar
Production and additional personnel
Patrick Dillett – mixing
DNA – production
Scott Hull – engineering
John Kilgore – recording
Howie Weinberg – mastering

References 

1993 live albums
Avant Records albums
DNA (American band) albums